Arumbakkam is a residential locality in Chennai.

The locality
Arumbakkam is notable for D G Vaishnav College. The Chennai Bottling Company (popularly known as the Gold Spot Company) was located here, which has now been converted into a car dealership. The locality is surrounded by Koyambedu, Aminjikarai and Anna Nagar. Other important locations are the Varadharraja Perumal Temple (built 500 years ago) and the Vinayagar Temple.

The Tamil Nadu Pollution Control Board (TNPCB) is located here. The Jai Nagar park and the State Election Commission of India, the headquarters of the Tamil Nadu Election Commission, are located opposite the CMBT.

The area is relatively rich in ground water, and it is said that this area was a mango-cultivating area until around 1960. This area falls under the Central Chennai constituency. It is a low-lying area and used to get waterlogged frequently till the late 1990s, after which improvements in the storm water drainage system, has considerably reduced waterlogging.

Location in context

Areas of Interest

Hospitals
Smile Zone Dental Clinic
 Siva Medicals, Valluvar Salai
 Prakash Dental Centre
 Kavitha Neuro Clinic
 Dr.Raj's Advanced Dental & Implant Centre
 Tamil Nadu Alluarjun fans association office
 Speed Medical Centre & Hospitals
 Indian Hospital
 Appaswamy Hospital
 Vasanthi Orthaeopadics

Temples
 Sri Panchali Amman Temple
 Sri Aadhi Parasakthi Amman Temple
 Sri Siddhi Vinayaga Temple
 Sri Vethapureeswara Sivan temple
 Sri Sundara Vinayagar Temple
 Sri Bala Vinayagar Temple
 Sri Sathya Varadharaja Perumal Temple
 Sri Uthaantchiyamman Temple
 Sri Muthu Mariyamman Temple
 Muthumariamman Temple
 Nagathammal Temple
 Santha Perumal Temple
 Sri Devi Elankaliamman Temple
 Periathupalai Amman Koil

Residencial Colonies
 Jaganathan Nagar 
 SBI Officers Colony
 SBI Staff Colony
 Jai Nagar
 Mangali Nagar
 MMDA Colony

Mall
 Megamart on P.H. road

Churches
 Blessing Worship Centre -(Behind Vasanthi Orthopaedic Hospital and M.R Hospital)
 ECI church
 Assemblies of God Arumbakkam
 Miracle healing center

Mosques
In PH road, opposite to pollution control board
Peter Raja St., opposite to Anna Arch
MGR st., MMDA Colony

Educational institutions

Schools
 MMDA, Government Higher Secondary School
 Kola Perumal Chetty Vaishnav Senior Secondary School (CBSE)
 Narayana E-Techno School(CBSE)
 Srimathi Maharanibai Jamunadoss Vaishnav Higher Secondary School
 Good Hope Matriculation Higher Secondary School
 National Star Matriculation Higher Secondary School
 Ambal Matriculation School
 Daniel Thomas Matric. Hr. Sec. School
 Mohammad Sathak Matriculation higher secondary school.

Colleges
 D.G.Vaishnav College( Arts & Science).

Archietrctural Sites
 Anna Arch (built by MGR in memory of his mentor C.N. Annadurai)
 Anna Arch Fly over

Other Important Landmarks
In Arumbakkam
 Jai Nagar park opposite CMBT
 Tamil Nadu pollution control board (TNPCB) in PH road
 Chennai Metro Rail Limited has started its construction work in Arumbakkam with the pile foundation work
 Arumbakkam will also have its own Metro Station (somewhere between SAF Games Village and Radha regent)
 Tamil Nadu Election Commission has opened its brand new office in arumbakkam opposite CMBT
 The Arumbakkam Koyambedu Roundabout was converted into a Multi Level, Partial Cloverleaf grade separator in 2011

Around Arumbakkam
 Chennai Moffusil Bus Terminus (CMBT), one of Asia's Largest Bus Terminus, is just across the 100 feet Road opposite to Arumbakkam.
 Ampa Skywalk, a Shopping Mall opened on the Nelson Manickam Road — P.H.Road Junction.
 A flyover is built in this junction to ease the traffic.
 Ozone Mall is another mall that is coming up in Anna Nagar and is very close to the Arumbakkam Koyambedu Roundana

Neighbourhoods in Chennai